Úrsula López (31 October 1870 – 3 September 1966), stage name Úrsula Falcón Quintero, was a Spanish zarzuela and variety singer and businesswoman. In addition to performing, she was known for her glamorous public image, often flaunting expensive clothes, jewelry, and an automobile.

Biography

Cuba and Mexico
Úrsula López was born in Las Palmas in the Canary Islands. The date of her birth is not known with certainty. It is listed as 31 October 1886 on her National Identity Document (DNI), but her marriage certificate (she married Luis Bellido Hortelano in the parochial church of the Holy Spirit of Havana) gives her age as 25 on 29 April 1896, so she may have been born on 31 October 1870.

In 1899, once the Cuban War of Independence was over, López moved to Mexico as a flamenco singer, beginning a successful artistic career. It was there that she gave birth to her son  on 15 July 1903.

According to Mexican critic and chronicler Manuel Mañón, "the year 1903 ended with the farewell of the soprano Úrsula López, who left for Veracruz, heading to Spain, after a long performance at the Teatro Principal."

The 15 November 1906 issue of the Madrid magazine El Arte de El Teatro dedicates its cover to her, with a photo caption reading "Úrsula López, the first comic soprano to act at Mexico's Teatro Principal."

Success in Madrid

In it, she played the role of "La Menta", singing cuplés, which proved to be very popular. She was also part of the revue A.B.C., replacing Emérita Álvarez Esparza.

The Spanish press began devoting a large amount of coverage to López, on subjects such as her luxury car, her jewelry, her shawls from Manila, her virtues as an artist, and her wealth. On 21 December 1908, she returned to Mexico, to liquidate her belongings in that country with the intention of leasing a theater in Madrid.

Úrsula López Zarzuelas Company

After a string of successful premieres, at the end of 1911, they left the Teatro Lírico. The Úrsula López Zarzuelas Company was hired by the playwright and businessman José López Silva and traveled to Argentina. Their performance at the Avenida Theatre in Buenos Aires in 1912 was a hit, after which they traveled to Montevideo. In addition to Úrsula López, the company included well-known soprano Amparo Taberner and stage director .

The 15 July 1912 issue of the biweekly Buenos Aires publication La revista teatral y social devotes an extensive article to López, and its 15 August issue features her photograph on its cover.

Back on the peninsula in 1913,  published an interview with López in Blanco y Negro, in which she talks about her future projects. Nuevo Mundo magazine included a photograph of her in February. They then went to Barcelona, acting at the Teatro Cómico, and continuing with a successful tour of the Spanish provinces.

On 14 March 1914, the Úrsula López Company embarked on the steamship , heading to Buenos Aires. But this American tour was unsuccessful, causing López and Luis Bellido great economic losses, so they returned to Spain.

Variety shows
López decided to present herself as a divette of variety shows before the Spanish public, debuting at the Teatro Lírico on 15 September 1915. She performed in prominent halls and theaters in Spain, achieving success equal to or greater than she had with zarzuelas. In 1918, she fulfilled some commitments abroad and then retired from the stage, dedicating herself to travel and enjoying her great fortune. In an interview with journalist Mario Hernández in the 5 September 1953 issue of Crítica magazine, she confesses: "Those jewels...that money, the wind took it away. Well, the wind did not take it so much as Paris – the Paris of that time and the theater business. I lived very well, for everything great, and that, it costs a lot of money."

Later life
She established her residence in Madrid, at "Villa Úrsula" in the Ciudad Lineal. There, with the help of her sister Reyes Falcón Quintero, she set up a luxuriously decorated boardinghouse named "Pensión Falcón". There she would enjoy her final years.

Úrsula López died in Madrid on 3 September 1966. Writer  penned a three-page obituary in ABC, placing her among "the forgotten goddesses", and calling her the "topmost soprano".

Works premiered at the Teatro Lírico

Discography

 Disco pizarra. 2 sides. Discopathe, num. 2401, 85474, 80 rpm. "Su Majestad el Schotiss", 1st part and 2nd part.
 Disco pizarra, 1 side. Gramophone disc, num. 264075, 80 rpm. Madrid. "La reina de las tintas", "Tango del picazón".
 Teatro y Varietés, Vol. 3 Cómicos y género chico. Remastered recordings. Track 18, "La reina de las tintas", "Picazón". Track 19, El "jipi", from El país de las hadas
 El país de las hadas
 La reina de las tintas

References

External links
 

1870 births
1966 deaths
20th-century Spanish actresses
20th-century Spanish businesswomen
20th-century Spanish businesspeople
Cupletistas
People from Las Palmas
Spanish musical theatre actresses
Spanish sopranos